Nysa, or Nysae or Nysai (Νῦσαι), was a village in ancient Boeotia on Mount Helicon.

References

Populated places in ancient Boeotia
Former populated places in Greece
Lost ancient cities and towns